Rottnest Island, often colloquially referred to as "Rotto", is a  island off the coast of Western Australia, located  west of Fremantle. A sandy, low-lying island formed on a base of aeolianite limestone, Rottnest is an A-class reserve, the highest level of protection afforded to public land.

Together with Garden Island, Rottnest Island is a remnant of Pleistocene dune ridges. Along with several other islands, Rottnest became separated from the mainland around 7,000 years ago, when sea levels rose; the traditional Noongar name for the island is Wadjemup, which means "place across the water where the spirits are". Human artefacts have been found on the island dating back at least 30,000 years, but visitation and habitation of the island by the Noongar people appears to have ceased following its separation from the mainland.

The island was first documented by Willem de Vlamingh in 1696, who called it 't Eylandt 't Rottenest ("Rats' Nest Island") after the quokka population. Following establishment of the Swan River Colony (now Perth) in 1829, the island was initially used by British settlers for agricultural purposes, and a permanent settlement was built in Thomson Bay. From 1838 to 1931, Rottnest Island was also used as a prison and forced labour camp for over 3,600 Aboriginal people, who were subjected to extremely harsh conditions on the island. Other historical uses of the island include as a military site, and for internment camps housing enemy aliens. Many of the island's buildings date from the colonial period, often made from locally quarried limestone, and are now used as accommodation for holidays.

Rottnest is an unincorporated area with no local government, subject to direct administration by the government of Western Australia. It is administered by the state's Rottnest Island Authority, which on 1 July 2017 became part of the newly created Department of Biodiversity, Conservation and Attractions. Rottnest is well known for its population of quokkas, and is also home to colonies of Australian sea lions and southern fur seals, as well as various birds and three native tree species, notably the Rottnest Island pine. The island is a popular recreational and tourist destination, with daily ferry services from Perth, the state's capital and largest city. It has a permanent population of around 300 people, with around 780,000 annual visitors.

History

Pre-European history
The land that is now Rottnest Island was inhabited by Noongar people until rising sea levels separated it from the mainland of Western Australia about 7,000 years ago. The island features in Noongar story lines as Wadjemup. Aboriginal artefacts on the island have been dated from 6,500 to more than 30,000 years ago. However, other evidence suggests human occupation significantly before 50,000, possibly as early as 70,000 BP.

No evidence has been found that the Whadjuk Noongar people continued to inhabit or visit the island after its separation from the mainland, and by the time of European exploration in the 1600s, the island is thought to have been unoccupied for thousands of years.

European exploration and settlement
The island was observed and explored by various Dutch, French, and English maritime expeditions from around 1619 onward, including by Frederick de Houtman around 28 July 1619.

The first Europeans known to have landed on Rottnest Island were about 14 sailors from a Dutch expedition, including Abraham Leeman van Santwits from Waeckende Boey, who landed near Bathurst Point on 19 March 1658 while their ship was careened nearby. Waeckende Boey (under command of Samuel Volkersen) had been searching for survivors of Vergulde Draeck, which had been wrecked off the western coast of Australia in April 1656.Volkersen described the island in his journal:
In slightly under 32° S. Lat. there is a large island, at about 3 miles' distance from the mainland of the South-land; this island has high mountains, with a good deal of brushwood and many thornbushes, so that it is hard to go over; here certain animals are found, since we saw many excrements, and besides two seals and a wild cat, resembling a civet-cat, but with browner hair. This island is dangerous to touch at, owing to the rocky reefs which are level with the water and below the surface, almost along the whole length of the shore; between it and the mainland there are also numerous rocks and reefs, and slightly more to southward there is another small island.

This large island to which we have been unwilling to give a name, leaving this matter to the Honourable Lord Governor-General's pleasure, may be seen at 7 or 8 miles' distance out at sea in fine weather. I surmise that brackish or freshwater might be obtainable there, and likewise good firewood, but not without great trouble.
In his 1681 chart, English captain John Daniel marked an island as Maiden's Isle, possibly referring to Rottnest. The name did not survive, however.

The island was given the name 't Eylandt 't Rottenest ("Rats' Nest Island"; the quokkas were mistaken for large rats) by Dutch captain Willem de Vlamingh, who spent six days exploring the island from 29 December 1696. De Vlamingh led a fleet of three ships, De Geelvink, De Nijptang and Weseltje, searching for the survivors of Ridderschap van Holland that had gone missing two years earlier, and anchored on the northern side of the island, near The Basin. He described the island as "...pleasurable above all islands I have ever seen -a paradise on earth". During their time on the island, they found no people. Holes were dug on the island, yielding water of good drinking quality. They also noted that the wood from the trees on the island had an exquisite scent – akin to rosewood - and a quantity was cut and brought on board the ship.

Other explorers who stopped at the island included members of the French expedition of Nicholas Baudin in Naturaliste and Geographe in 1801 (when he planted a flag and left a bottle with a letter) and 1803, Phillip Parker King in 1822, and Captain James Stirling in 1827. Early visitors commonly reported that much of the island was heavily wooded, which is not the case today.

In 1831, shortly after the establishment of the British Swan River Colony at nearby Fremantle, William Clarke and Robert Thomson received land grants for town lots and pasture land on the island. Thomson immediately moved to the island with his wife and eight children. He developed pasture land for hay production west of Herschel Lake as well as salt harvesting from the several salt lakes which was then exported to the mainland settlement. Salt was an important commodity before the advent of refrigeration.

Aboriginal prison and forced labour camp

Between 1838 and 1931, Aboriginal prisoners held on Rottnest Island were held in deplorable conditions and subjected to cruel and inhumane treatment. Of the approximately 3600 people imprisoned there, at least 373 people died and were buried in unmarked graves in at least two areas to the north of the Quod. It is the largest known deaths in custody gravesite in Australia.

Historical records note that the first cemetery, likely adjacent to the European cemetery, became full following an outbreak of influenza in 1883 and that a second was established further away from the prison. The area is now known as the Wadjemup Aboriginal Burial Ground. Although slavery, as legally defined, never existed in Western Australia, the "assignment" system effectively implemented a system of forced labour, and was condemned by Reverend J. B. Gribble and the Anti-Slavery Society. Aboriginal people who refused assignment were sent to Rottnest Island to be "civilised", and were used in chain-gangs to perform hard labour including farming, quarrying, and collecting salt. Most of the island's historic Settlementincluding Government House (Hotel Rottnest), the church, Salt Store, museum, gift shop, original waterfront cottages and The Quodwas built by forced Aboriginal prison labour working under extremely harsh conditions.

Six Aboriginal prisoners were sent to Rottnest Island in August 1838 under the superintendence of Constable Laurence Welch and a small military force: Helia, for murder; Buoyeen, for assault; Molly Dobbin, Tyoocan, Goodap, and Cogat, for theft. All six escaped shortly after their arrival by stealing Thomson's boat. Helia drowned during the crossing, but the others apparently survived.

The Colonial Secretary, Peter Broun, announced in June 1839 that the island would be "converted to an Establishment for the Aborigines", and between 1838 and 1931 (except for the period from 1849 to 1855) Rottnest was used as an Aboriginal prison. Henry Vincent, the Gaoler at Fremantle, was put in charge of the establishment. 

On 7 December 1848, there was another escape by Aboriginal prisoners, with eight out of the 10 prisoners then on the island escaping. Those who escaped came from the north and eastward. "The plan of escape, as related by one of themselves, exhibits considerable foresight and sagacity, being not only well conceived, but as well executed". The Aboriginals burrowed under the sill door until there was room for them to all pass underneath. They all then crept over the roof of Vincent's kitchen and proceeded to the salt house, through the window of which they got out a dinghy which was confined there. Five of the escapees were retaken by J. Drummond at Toodyay.

A quadrangular building was constructed in 1863–1864 and generally referred to as "the Quod"; it was used for tourist accommodation until 2018, when it was closed after decades of protests by Aboriginal people. There were about twenty prisoners there in 1844; by 1880, there were 170. Vincent retired in 1867 after complaints regarding cruelty to prisoners; he was replaced by William Jackson. In the early 1880s, an influenza epidemic struck, killing about sixty inmates.In 1902, the abolition of the prison was announced. At that time, there were 33 Aboriginal prisoners serving sentences there. However, the prison continued to be used as a forced labour camp for Aboriginal prisoners until 1931.

Some 3,700 Aboriginal men and boys were imprisoned there during the life of the establishment. There may be as many as 369 inmates' graves on the island; one writer has suggested that 95% of the deaths were from influenza. In 2015 – after numerous protests from local Aboriginal people for the Rottnest Island Authority to create a memorial recognising the events, deaths, and unmarked graves which lie on Rottnest Island – work begun on the Wadjemup Aboriginal Burial Ground.

Artefacts from this period continue to be identified and recorded. Professor Len Collard describes these artefacts, such as glass and ceramic spearheads, as an important demonstration of transitional cultural engineering through use of traditional methods to modify the new materials of European settlement.

Executions
Five Aboriginal prisoners were executed on Rottnest in the late 19th century, all for murder:

 Tampin (16 July 1879): Hanged for the murder of John Moir at Stokes Inlet on 29 March 1877
 Wangabiddi (18 June 1883): Hanged for the murder of Charles Redfern at Minni-Minni on the Gascoyne River in May 1882
 Guerilla (18 June 1883): Hanged for the murder of Anthony Cornish at Fitzroy River on 12 December 1882
 Naracorie (3 August 1883): Hanged for the murder of Charles Brackell at Wandagee on the Minilya River on 31 July 1882
 Calabungamarra (13 June 1888): Hanged for the murder of a Chinese man, Indyco, at Hamersley Range

Wadjemup Aboriginal Burial Ground

In 2015 the restoration and recognition of the Wadjemup Aboriginal Burial Ground began.  buildings have been removed from the site and pathway constructed around it. Prior to the closure of the tourist camp in 2018, the burial ground was being using as a spot to pitch tents.

Boys' reformatory

A reformatory for boys was opened on 16 May 1881. The reformatory buildings were adjacent to the Quod and included a workshop, a kitchen, two large dormitories, a school room, and four small cells. Carpenter John Watson constructed the buildings and became the superintendent for the life of the establishment. Watson taught the boys carpentry, joinery, and gardening.

During a severe influenza epidemic in 1883, the colonial surgeon, Dr Alfred R Waylen, directed one of the large rooms in the reformatory to be used as a hospital. An estimate of sixty Indigenous deaths for that year was given by eye-witness, Edward Watson. In 1887, the prison superintendent reported one room in the reformatory still being used for sick prisoners, with two rooms used the previous winter, and made an appeal for a new hospital to be built for the Indigenous prisoners.

In May 1898, two boys disappeared, apparently drowned, after escaping from the reformatory and stealing a dinghy.

After 20 years of operation, the facility closed on 21 September 1901 when the remaining 14 inmates were transferred to an industrial school on the mainland.

The reformatory buildings are now used as holiday accommodation as part of the Rottnest Lodge.

Fires
In 1856, the settlement structures – the two-storey prison / workshop building, stables, barns, and piggery were burnt down. Their former locations are identified in the area between the shops in the settlement area. The fire was deliberately lit by the superintendent, Henry Vincent, after two prisoners had escaped into nearby bush. Vincent lit the fire with the intent of flushing the prisoners out of their hiding place. The prevailing winds at the time were blowing away from the buildings; however, the wind changed direction which brought the flames into the settlement. About 50 tons of hay was also destroyed.

Major bushfires occurred in March 1894, January 1910, January 1917, March 1939, February 1949, and a very significant fire which consumed around two-thirds of the island in 1955. Some of these bushfires were caused by European hunting parties and on one occasion almost wiped out the quokka population.

Pilot service
In 1846, a pilot service was established under Captain Edward Back. It continued for 56 years until 1903. The pilot's and crews quarters were located in at least three of the colonial buildings identified in the colonial buildings of Rottnest Island — buildings 4, 5, and 6.

Internment camp
Rottnest was the site of internment camps in both World War I and World War II In World War I, it was mostly used for German and Austrian suspected enemy aliens, and was closed towards the end of the war, due to poor living conditions. The camp was sited near the present-day Caroline Thomson Camping Area.

In World War II, the camp was used exclusively for Italian enemy aliens and was situated near the airstrip. It had capacity for 120 internees.

It was closed about halfway through the war, and its occupants were sent to various other internment and work camps on the mainland.

Military history

Also during World War II, two 9.2 inch guns were installed near the middle of the island at Oliver Hill, and two 6 inch guns installed at Bickley Point, for defence of the Fremantle port. The location of the island was seen as being important to the defense of the important port of Fremantle, the major base for the Allies in the Indian Ocean, as bombardment of any attacking ships could be made from the island before the ships would come into range of the port.

A light railway was built from the jetty at Kingstown Barracks on Thomson Bay, to transport materiel and munitions to the guns. Captain (later Brigadier) Frank Bertram Hussey (1908–1985) was seconded from the Australian Staff Corps to oversee the construction of this. The military fixtures including the barracks and railway became known as the "Rottnest Island Fortress". A number of concrete lookouts and bunkers were built around the island also.

Near Wadjemup Lighthouse, a Battery Observation Post (BOP) was built as a lookout to coordinate aiming and firings from the Bickley and Oliver Hill Batteries. A Signals Building, associated with the BOP and a Women's Army Barracks, built to house officers and staff who operated the BOP were constructed there also. The latter building is used nowadays for occasional accommodation for University and other scientific research groups working on the island.

After World War II, the guns and infrastructure were decommissioned and parts of the railway removed. The 9.2 inch battery, however, was saved from disposal because the high cost of removing and shipping the guns to the mainland exceeded their value as scrap metal.

In the 1990s, the gun emplacements and railway were extensively reconstructed, and since then a popular tourist activity has included a tour of the guns and the tunnels, with the journey to the battery being made on a purpose-built train from Kingstown Barracks. In November 2003 a new railcar was put into service for this route, called the Captain Hussey (named after Brigadier Hussey; see above). The railcar was built with volunteer assistance, and cost $171,500.

Communications

Prior to about 1880, communication with the mainland was primarily with semaphore flags and flares. A staffed lookout at Bathurst Point included a signalling station which relayed shipping information between Wadjemup Lighthouse at the centre of the island and Arthur Head at Fremantle.

A heliograph was installed in 1879 at Signal Hill, the small rise overlooking the main settlement in Thomson Bay. A Frenchman by the name of Henri Courderot was the heliograph operator and was paid $10 per year to operate the service once a day weather permitting.

A single circuit submarine communications cable was laid from Cottesloe in 1900, after which the heliograph service was discontinued. This was replaced with a larger cable in 1935.

Administration
After Rottnest was proclaimed as an A-class Reserve in 1917, management was vested in the "Rottnest Island Board of Control" which continued until 1956. The first chairman was Hal Colebatch, who served from 13 May 1917 to 23 July 1956. Rottnest Island was declared an A class reserve under the Permanent Reserves Act in May 1917. A Board was then appointed under the Parks and Reserves Act to control and manage the island (excluding the lighthouse and prison reserve). The Board of Control became a Body Corporate in 1956 and became a Board of Management.

Between 24 July 1956 and 29 May 1988, it was changed to the "Board of Management". Section 3, subsection 4 of the Parks and Reserves Act 1895–1955 provided legislative scope for the Rottnest Island Board of Control became a Body Corporate on 24 July 1956. The Rottnest Island Board of Control became the Rottnest Island Board of Management "with power to sue and be sued in its corporate name, to acquire, hold, lease and dispose of real and personal property, to borrow money with the approval of the Governor and to do and permit to be done all things which are required by the Act to the be done by the Board ...", until 1988 at which time it became the Rottnest Island Authority. During this time the managing instrumentality was informally and generally referred to as the "Rottnest Island Board" (RIB). In 1988 the "Rottnest Island Authority" commenced operations.

In May 1966, Rottnest Island and Carnac Island were included in the boundaries of the Shire of Cockburn, which became the City of Cockburn in 1971. However, the council has "no involvement in or responsibility for any functions relating to the control and management of the islands".

On 28 April 2017, the government of Western Australia announced that the Department of Parks and Wildlife would merge with the Botanic Gardens and Parks Authority, the Zoological Parks Authority, and the Rottnest Island Authority on 1 July 2017 to form the Department of Biodiversity, Conservation and Attractions.

COVID-19 pandemic 
Between March and May 2020, during the COVID-19 pandemic in Australia, the island was used as a quarantine station for arriving tourists and returning Australians.

Flora and fauna

Birds
Many coastal birds are frequently found in Rottnest. These include the pied cormorant, osprey, pied oystercatcher, silver gull, crested tern, fairy tern, bridled tern, rock parrot and the reef heron. The island salt lakes contain brine shrimp which support birds such as the red-necked avocet, banded stilt, ruddy turnstone, curlew sandpiper, red-capped dotterel, Australian shelduck, red-necked stint, grey plover, white-fronted chat, Caspian tern and the crested tern. Several pairs of osprey nest at Rottnest each year; one nest at Salmon Point is estimated to be 70 years old. Introduced peafowl are often seen near the main settlement.

The island has been identified by BirdLife International as an Important Bird Area (IBA) because it supports important breeding populations of the fairy terns (200-300 breeding pairs), over 1% of the non-breeding population of banded stilts (with up to 20,000 birds) and regionally significant numbers of wedge-tailed shearwaters and red-necked stints.

Other animals

Rottnest is one of the few areas in the world where the native quokka can be found. Its survival there is largely due to the exclusion of natural or introduced predators compared to the mainland.

Reptiles include dugite (Pseudonaja affinis), the southern blind snake (Ramphotyphlops australis), King's skink (Egernia kingii), bobtail (Tiliqua rugosa), marbled gecko (Christinus marmoratus), west coast ctenotus (Ctenotus fallens) and Burton's legless lizard (Lialis burtonis). There are three species of frogs: the moaning frog (Heleioporus eyrei), the western green tree frog (Litoria moorei) and the sign-bearing froglet (Crinia insignifera).With the extensive reefs surrounding the island, many species of fish, crustaceans, and coral can be found. Cetaceans such as bottlenose dolphins, and migrating humpbacks, and fewer southern rights, and the Perth Canyon off the island is one of main habitats for blue whales in Australia, for which there are also whale watching expeditions. A colony of Australian sea lions reside at Dyer Island and a colony of New Zealand fur seals (Arctophoca forsteri) reside at Cathedral Rocks.

Feral animals
Domestic cats were introduced to Rottnest both as pets and as predators of commensal pest animals such as the black rat and house mouse at various times since European settlement. Historically, the Rottnest Island Authority has attempted to rid the island of all cats since the 1960s. It was suggested that cats may be influencing the abundance of native fauna and if left uncontrolled, the cat population was likely to increase and could result in considerable damage to ground-nesting birds and heavy predation pressure on quokkas and reptile species.

A feral cat monitoring and trapping campaign was conducted in November 2001 and 2002. Four cats were trapped and no further cat activity has been observed or cats sighted by Rottnest Island staff or the general public in the eight years subsequent to this program suggesting that eradication has been successfully achieved.

In 2008 the island implemented a pest bird management plan, which targets birds considered to be pest species, including silver gulls, Australian ravens, common (ring-necked) pheasant, galahs, peafowl and rainbow lorikeets. Peafowl were believed to have been released on the island between 1910 and 1915. During the late 1950s, the population reached no more than 50 birds. Only three males (peacocks) were left after the 2009 cull.

Plants

The island includes three native woodland tree species, the Rottnest Island pine (Callitris preissii), the Rottnest Island teatree (Melaleuca lanceolata) and Acacia rostellifera. The Rottnest Island daisy (Trachymene coerulea) is a commonly occurring flowering native which is also grown widely as an ornamental garden plant. Coastal dune flora include searocket (Cakile), beach spinifex (Spinifex longifolius) and wild rosemary (Olearia axillaris).

A Pinus radiata plantation was established by internees during World War I, roughly bordering the main settlement, The Basin and Bathurst. Plantation remnants can be seen around the golf course.

Rottnest was often described as heavily wooded by early explorers. A conservation program including reforestation is ongoing. An island-based nursery propagates plants with island provenance used in the reforestation program and in remediating uncontrolled beach access.

Geographical features

Climate
Rottnest Island has a Mediterranean climate (Köppen climate classification Csa) with warm dry summers and mild wet winters. Although the summers get little rain, they are humid.

Tourism and facilities

The island became largely devoted to recreational use from the 1900s, aside from a brief period of exclusive military use during World War II. It is now visited annually by 450,000 to 500,000 visitors, an average of 330,000 of those arriving by ferry or air taxi. 70% of all visitors come for the day only. The majority of visitors arrive in summer, with nearly 20% of all visitors coming in January.
 
The only motor vehicles permitted on the island are emergency and service vehicles, although there is also a bus service. Cycling is the transport of choice for most visitors, with many either bringing a bicycle with them or hiring one at the island's facility.

The main settlement is located at Thomson Bay, which is a protected north-easterly bay facing the mainland. Other settlements are located at Geordie Bay and Longreach Bay on the northern side of the island. All are sheltered bays and well suited for boating and swimming. Many other bays around the island have permanent boat moorings which can be leased from the Rottnest Island Authority. 
The island has accommodation for up to 5,500 visitors, while day-only visitors can number up to 20,000 at any one time. Rottnest Island Authority accommodation options include 291 villas, units and cottages which sleep 4, 6 or 8 people and which are self-catering. This style of accommodation is reasonably basic. Demand for accommodation is very high during the summer months. Ballots are no longer held and guests can book up to 18 months in advance.Other accommodation options include the below.
 Group accommodation at Kingstown Barracks.
 The Hotel Rottnest, formerly called the Quokka Arms Hotel and prior to that the Governor's residence.
 The Rottnest Lodge.
Cabins at Caroline Thomson provide an alternative to camping and are popular with families, sleeping up to 6 with self-contained cooking and washing facilities.

Most visitors arrive on one of the ferries from Fremantle, Perth, and Hillarys. These are operated by Rottnest Express, Rottnest Fast Ferries and more recently SeaLink. Rottnest Island Airport for light aircraft is located near the main settlement.

The island was previously popular with Year-12 school leavers celebrating the end of their exams each November — known in Western Australia as "Leavers week" or just "Leavers" — RIA accommodation on the island was reserved for leavers during this time. Identification and proof of being a current secondary school leaver was required to book accommodation during this period. A decrease in attendance over this period of time has led to leavers week no longer occurring on Rottnest.

Catering facilities in the Thomson Bay foreshore area include a Dôme coffee shop, Thomsons Restaurant; Quokka Joes; Rottnest Lodge and the Hotel Rottnest. The main settlement has a general store, including a liquor outlet, a bakery, cafe/coffee shop, Subway and clothing store. The Red Rooster store closed in 2011. The Lodge includes several restaurants and bars also. Geordie Bay also has a general store, liquor outlet, and Geordie Cafe.

A luxury hotel was planned for the island but negotiations with preferred proponents ceased. The Authority stated that "The development of a new hotel at Mount Herschel remains a priority.".

The island was the site of an important Australian High Court case, Nagle v Rottnest Island Authority, which arose after a man dived off a rock on Rottnest Island and became a quadriplegic. It was held that, as the island authority had promoted the site as a venue for swimming and had not put up a warning notice, it was liable for causing the injury.

Activities

Diving is a popular activity at Rottnest. Its varied limestone reef terrain and plentiful fish make it an interesting diving destination. In particular, diving for crayfish Western rock lobster, is popular in the summer months. The season opens on 15 November each year and runs until 30 June. Crayfish may be caught in special traps or "pots", or when diving either by hand or by using a crayfish "loop". The loop is a spring-loaded steel cable attached to a long pole. It is illegal to use any means that might puncture the shell to catch the crayfish. The bag limit is 6 per licence per day, with a maximum of 12 per boat per day.

Local delicacies Western Rock Lobster (Panulirus cygnus) and Sea Scallop (Ylistrum balloti) are fresh caught and cooked on Rottnest Cruises "Luxe Island Seafood Cruise" during open season.

A snorkel trail at Parker Point features underwater interpretative plaques that give information about the marine environments surrounding Rottnest. The island is the southernmost point along the Western Australian coastline at which coral grows.  The Rottnest Island Wreck Trail was developed in conjunction with the Western Australian Museum in 1980 as the first underwater interpretative trail in the southern hemisphere. Visits to some of the Rottnest Island shipwrecks, in essence a museum-without-walls can be made by glass-bottomed boat, or by scuba and snorkel. The SS Macedon site is one of the most visited wrecks in Australia.

The island features historic buildings and pleasant beaches (all reachable via the many cycling tracks; cycling being the island's main mode of transport – private or hire cars are not allowed on the island).

Annual events
The Rottnest Channel Swim is a long-distance swimming event from Cottesloe Beach to Rottnest Island. It is held each February.
The Rottnest Marathon & Fun Run is an annual running event operated late each October by the West Australian Marathon Club.
"Rottofest" is a popular comedy, film and music festival held annually in September.
 Leavers week (November), when high-school graduates visit Rottnest to celebrate the end of their final exams.
 "Swim Thru Rottnest" is an annual 1600-metre swim held on the first Saturday in December. The event was first held in 1977. Competitors start on the east side of the Army Jetty in Thomson Bay, swim to the natural jetty and then return to the Army jetty. The event is run by the Cottesloe Crabs Winter Swimming Club.
 "The Doctor" is a  surfski and paddle race from the Army jetty to Sorrento Beach. It is held each January.
 "Fremantle to Rottnest Big Splash" is a masters swimming race from Leighton Beach to Rottnest.

Transport

In 2017, a new ferry operator, SeaLink Rottnest Island, commenced services to the island and reduced the ferry costs by 30%.

Other ferry services are provided from Perth and Fremantle by Rottnest Express and Rottnest Fast Ferries from Hillarys Boat Harbour. Ferries take approximately 25 minutes from Fremantle, 45 minutes from Hillarys, or 90 minutes from Perth.

Bus services on the island were previously operated by the Rottnest Island Authority under the Island Explorer brand. In November 2015, Adams Coachlines commenced a 10-year contract to operate all bus services.

Helicopter and light plane flights are also available.

Private cars are not allowed on the island; the most common private transport is by bicycle or walking.

Services

Rottnest Island has few permanent residents, with most island workers commuting from the mainland.

As Rottnest is isolated from the mainland, and has no fresh surface water, providing water, power and waste disposal has always been difficult and expensive. In 1996, Rottnest introduced the first public place recycling program in Western Australia. In 2000, the island won the 3R awards (reduce, reuse and recycle). A daily supply barge (the Spinifex) makes a return trip from Fremantle, delivering supplies and removing rubbish.

For many years during the twentieth century, the water supply was rainwater harvested from several large bitumen sealed catchment areas behind Longreach Bay. In the 1970s, freshwater was found underground and was used to supplement the rainfall supply.

Experimental wind turbines were commissioned in 1978; however, high maintenance requirements and excessive power generation resulted in diesel fuel remaining the main power source. In 2004, a new  wind-diesel system was erected; other works at the time included upgrades to the power station and the installation of low load diesel generators.

Two fully automated lighthouses operate on the island to aid passing maritime traffic: Bathurst Lighthouse and Wadjemup Lighthouse. An extensive network of flashing markers and transit beacons indicate safe passages through the rocky entrances to bays.

Volunteer groups working on Rottnest 
Volunteering has been a part of the scene on Rottnest Island since the Winnit Club began working here in the Summer of 1930–1931. Other volunteer organizations have included the Rottnest Island Foundation, the Rottnest Society, and the Rottnest Voluntary Guides Association. Tasks vary, including guided tours, tree planting, litter collection, and the building of access boardwalks and stairs.

The RIA employs a full-time volunteer coordinator. Rottnest Island Volunteer Fire and Rescue Services (RIVFRS), this brigade is a "private brigade" where the RIA funds critical funding to allow the brigade to function. The brigade is trained to be first response to any emergency on the island assisted by agencies on and off the island. Most of the Members are Working Residents in Volunteering roles.

Popular culture
 A 1912 film, Trip to Rottnest, made by the Australian Government to popularise Rottnest as a holiday destination, is thought to be one of the first of its kind.

See also
 Rottnest ship graveyard

Notes

References

Further reading

External links

 
 
 

 
Car-free zones in Oceania
City of Cockburn
Important Bird Areas of Western Australia
Landmarks in Perth, Western Australia
Maritime history of the Dutch East India Company
Underwater diving sites in Australia